Academy Award Review of Walt Disney Cartoons is a Walt Disney animated film released in the United States on May 19, 1937, for a limited time to help promote the upcoming release of Snow White and the Seven Dwarfs. It was a collection of five Oscar-winning Silly Symphonies shorts, bridged together with title cards and a narrator. Like The Many Adventures of Winnie the Pooh, each of the cartoons had been released on their own at first before being collected together as one film. The separate cartoon shorts are now available on DVD. In addition, the film is 41 minutes long, just like Saludos Amigos. However, while this film is fully animated, Saludos Amigos would be far shorter without the live-action sequences. It is considered the first film in the Walt Disney Pictures filmography.

Academy Award Review of Walt Disney Cartoons was re-released and updated with additional four shorts in 1966 with no narration.

Both versions of the film were released in Japan on LaserDisc on June 21, 1985.

Film segments
The original film consists of the following five shorts:

 Flowers and Trees (1932)
 Three Little Pigs (1933)
 The Tortoise and the Hare (1934)
 Three Orphan Kittens (1935)
 The Country Cousin (1936)

The following additional shorts were included in the 1966 release: 
 The Old Mill (1937)
 Ferdinand the Bull (1938)
 The Ugly Duckling (1939)
 Lend a Paw (1941)

See also
List of animated feature films
List of package films

References

External links
 
 
 

1937 films
1937 animated films
Disney animated films
Animated anthology films
1930s English-language films
1930s American animated films